Chertsey Bridge is a road bridge across the River Thames in England, connecting Chertsey to low-lying riverside meadows in Laleham, Surrey. The bridge is a seven-arch tied arch white stone bridge built 1783–85 and is a Grade II* listed building. It has a weight restriction of 18 tonnes for LGVs.

The first bridge on the site was built some time after 1299 as in that year the king and his family were carried over the river by a ferry-woman called Sibille. The earliest written forebear to this bridge is that of 1530: a "goodly Bridg of Timber newly repaird". By 1580 it was dilapidated and the Crown, who had acquired responsibility from Chertsey Abbey, was trying to find someone on whom they could pin the bill for repairs. The documents record the dimensions as "210 feet in length and 15 feet in breadth". In 1632 the bridge, which was slanted upwards from Middlesex to Surrey, was described as like the work of a left-handed man. The slant was more annoying to navigation and passage was reported in 1774 to be very inconvenient and dangerous.

The present stone bridge was first considered in 1780 and replacement of the old one began in 1783. There were 184 piles for the old bridge, which were cut off six feet below high-water mark, and the materials of the old bridge fetched £120 at auction in August 1784. The architect of the new bridge was James Paine and the surveyor was Kenton Couse. It was built at a cost of £6813 4s 11d. In an early example of contract dispute, the contractor built the number of arches specified, but as they did not reach the shore, the counties had to pay, at extra expense, for linking the bridge to the banks.

On the Middlesex bank, cows graze downstream in Dumsey Meadow, a Site of Special Scientific Interest, and upstream is Laleham Park. On the Surrey bank are the outskirts of Chertsey with Abbey Chase house on the river bank. At the south east end of the bridge is a late-19th-century square cast-iron coal-tax post with cornice and capping, and the City of London shield on one face.  It is grade II listed.

In Film

It is the bridge over which Rex Harrison drives his tank to his character's (Vivian Kenway's) death in the 1945 film, The Rake's Progress (film).

See also
 Crossings of the River Thames

References

External links 
 

Bridges across the River Thames
Bridges in Surrey
Stone bridges in England
Bridges completed in 1785
Grade II* listed buildings in Surrey
Road bridges in England